The Walkers were a Danish glam rock band featuring singer-composer Torben Lendager, guitarist Gert Michelsen, drummer-lyricist Poul Dehnhardt and bassist Jan Kanstrup Hansen. It was founded in 1968 and broke up in 1977. They made several comebacks after their initial breakup.

Walkers' hits include song "Little Kitty", which was in 2000 covered by another Danish band, Creamy, and "Sha-La-La-La-La", which was covered the same year by Vengaboys, and in 1974 by Cantopop band The Wynners.

Discography

Studio albums

Compilation albums

Singles

References

External links 
 

Danish rock music groups
1968 establishments in Denmark
2000 establishments in Denmark
1977 disestablishments in Denmark
Musical groups established in 1968
Musical groups established in 2000
Musical groups disestablished in 1977
Philips Records artists